Live in Montreux is a bossa nova album by João Gilberto, recorded
live in the 1985 Montreux Jazz Festival and released in 1987. This is a single-disc
edition of the double album Live at the 19th Montreux Jazz Festival, released in 1986.

Track listing
 "Sem Compromisso" (Geraldo Pereira, Nelson Trigueiro) – 4:05
 "Menino do Rio" (Caetano Veloso) – 3:45
 "Retrato em Branco e Preto" (Chico Buarque, Antônio Carlos Jobim) – 6:36
 "Pra que Discutir com Madame" (Haroldo Barbosa, Antonio Almeida) – 6:25
 "Garota de Ipanema" (Jobim, Vinicius de Moraes) – 3:42
 "Adeus América" (Barbosa, Geraldo Jacques) – 6:50
 "Estate" (Bruno Brighetti, Bruno Martino) – 5:18
 "Morena Boca de Ouro" (Ary Barroso) – 5:37
 "A Felicidade" (Jobim, de Moraes) – 5:10
 "Preconceito" (Marino Pinto, Wilson Batista) – 2:25
 "Isto Aqui o Que E" [labelled "Sandalia de Prata"] (Barroso) – 6:43
 "Rosa Morena" (Dorival Caymmi) – 5:24
 "Aquarela do Brasil" (Barroso) – 7:50

Personnel
 João Gilberto – Acoustic guitar and vocals

References

Bossa nova albums
João Gilberto live albums
1987 live albums
Elektra/Musician live albums
Albums recorded at the Montreux Jazz Festival